James Paul Casciano is an American college basketball coach and the former head men's basketball coach at the New Jersey Institute of Technology. He stepped down after going 0–29 with the Highlanders in 2007–08 although he was not physically there for a 12-game leave of absence (coached by assistant coach Wendell Alexis during his medical leaves), which is the worst winless season in unofficial NCAA Division I basketball history (record does not officially count because NJIT was transiting from Division II to Division I during that period).

Head coaching record 

Only won 12 games in his first 3 seasons at King's College, PA

References
 'NCAA Division 1 Statistics 2010'
 NJIT Men's Basketball Team Media Guide
 Saint Michael's College Men's Basketball Awards
 Men's Head Basketball Coach Jim Casciano Resigns

External links
 Official NJIT Highlander website
 NJIT Men's Basketball Team Media Guide
 Saint Michael's College Men's Basketball Awards

1952 births
Living people
Basketball coaches from Pennsylvania
Basketball players from Pennsylvania
College men's basketball head coaches in the United States
Delaware Fightin' Blue Hens men's basketball coaches
Drexel Dragons men's basketball players
King's College Monarchs men's basketball coaches
NJIT Highlanders men's basketball coaches
Old Dominion Monarchs men's basketball coaches
People from Bridgeport, Pennsylvania
Radford Highlanders men's basketball coaches
Temple Owls women's basketball coaches
Villanova Wildcats men's basketball coaches
UMPI Owls men's basketball coaches
Washington and Lee Generals men's basketball coaches
Castleton Spartans men's basketball coaches
Saint Michael's Purple Knights men's basketball coaches
Sportspeople from Montgomery County, Pennsylvania
American men's basketball players